Luanchuan County is a county under the jurisdiction of the prefecture-level city of Luoyang, in the west of Henan province, China.

The county contains significant deposits of molybdenum and tungsten.

Administrative divisions
As 2012, this county is divided to 7 towns and 7 townships.
Towns

Townships

Climate

Education

There is a central elementary school in Qiuba Town.

See also 

 Luanchuanraptor

References

External links
Official website of Luanchuan County Government

County-level divisions of Henan
Luoyang